Iamblichus of Trier also known as Jamblichus or Jamblychus was a 5th-century bishop of Trier from 475/76.

Background
He is attested in an inscription found in Chalon-sur-Saône.  There seems to be no doubt about his historicity, although records from his time are scant due to the transition from the Roman Empire to Frankish rule.

References

Further reading

 

Gallo-Roman saints
Saints of Germania
5th-century Christian martyrs
Year of birth unknown
5th-century bishops in Germania
5th-century Christian saints
Roman Catholic bishops of Trier